Raging Slab is the major label debut of American hard rock band Raging Slab, released in 1989. The album contains the singles "Don't Dog Me" and "Bent For Silver". "Don't Dog Me" was a minor hit on radio and MTV.

The album peaked at No. 113 on the Billboard 200.

Critical reception
Trouser Press praised the "much better songwriting" and "muscular production." The Encyclopedia of Popular Music deemed the album "excellent." The Chicago Tribune wrote that "[Greg] Strzempka`s gutsy voice and the band`s ferocious bar-room intensity are enough to give any rock fan a thrill." The Morning Call likened the band to "Black Oak Arkansas raised to the 10th power."

Track listing
All songs written by Greg Strzempka.

Personnel

Band members
Greg Strzempka - vocals, guitar
Elyse Steinman - bottleneck guitar
Alec Morton - bass guitar
Mark Middleton - lead guitar
Bob Pantella - drums (credited but does not play on album)

Additional personnel
Tony Scaglione - drums on all tracks except "Get Off My Jollies"
Steve "Doc Killdrums" Wacholz - drums on "Get Off My Jollies"
Ray Gillen - backing vocals on "Shiny Mama"
Paul Presttopino - dobro solo on "Sorry's All I Got"
Norm Chynoweth - piano on "Dig A Hole"

Credits
Produced by Daniel Rey
Mixed by Gary Lyons for So Good Productions
Mastered by George Marino at Sterling Sound, NYC

References

 

1989 debut albums
Raging Slab albums
Albums produced by Daniel Rey
Albums recorded at Record Plant (New York City)
RCA Records albums